is a Japanese-American musician. She was the main vocalist and keyboardist of the dream pop band Asobi Seksu.

Musical career

In 2001, she founded the dream pop band Asobi Seksu with guitarist James Hanna, bassist Glenn Waldman and drummer Keith Hopkin. The band released their debut album in 2004. The following album, Citrus was released in 2006, after a lineup change. The band released Hush and Fluorescence in 2009 and 2011, respectively, after a second lineup change. In 2013, the band announced an indefinite hiatus.

In May 2009, Chikudate released the "Sampo" single with Pocket, featuring remixes by Mux Mool, Blue Eyes, and Craig Wedren.

Personal life
Chikudate was born in Japan to an Okinawan mother, and has stated that apart from her mother, most of her maternal relatives reside in Okinawa. In her early childhood, she moved to Southern California with her parents and spent her childhood there. At age 16, she moved to New York by herself, leaving behind her family.

References

Living people
American women pop singers
Year of birth missing (living people)
American musicians of Japanese descent
American people of Okinawan descent
Japanese emigrants to the United States
Shoegaze musicians
American women musicians of Japanese descent
21st-century American women